Janne Juhani Niskala (born 22 September 1981) is a Finnish former professional ice hockey defenceman. He last played for Lukko of the Finnish Liiga.

Playing career
Niskala was drafted by the Nashville Predators in the 2004 NHL Entry Draft in 5th round as the 147th pick overall. He is known for his good offensive skills and his power play scoring ability.

Niskala has played in Finland for the SM-liiga club Lukko for five seasons. During the 2000–01 season he played in the Finnish second tier division but also for the British club Manchester Storm. He has spent one season with the Swiss club EV Zug and one for the Swedish Elitserien club Färjestads BK. In Sweden he was reunited with his former team mate from Lukko, Esa Pirnes. During the 2006–07 season in Sweden, Niskala led all defensemen in both points and goals. He also finished first in the plus/minus statistics with a plus-25 rating.

Following his big season with Färjestad, Niskala signed a one-year contract with the Nashville Predators of the National Hockey League (NHL), but spent the entire 2007–08 season with the farm team Milwaukee Admirals of the American Hockey League (AHL). Niskala was traded to the Philadelphia Flyers on 24 June 2008 in exchange for Triston Grant and a 7th round draft pick in the 2009 NHL Entry Draft. On 30 June 2008, he was traded to the Tampa Bay Lightning for a 6th round draft pick in the 2009 NHL Entry Draft. He scored a goal in his first NHL preseason game on 20 September 2008 against the Penguins. He then scored his first NHL goal in his third NHL game, on 11 October against Michael Leighton of the Carolina Hurricanes. Niskala only play six games for the Lightning before asking to be waived since he had been cut off the roster. On 13 November, he signed a two-year contract with Frölunda HC in Elitserien.

On 4 May 2011, he moved from KHL's Metallurg Magnitogorsk to Atlant Mytishchi.

On 9 October 2012, Atlant Mytishchi traded Janne Niskala to HC Dinamo Minsk for Jonas Frögren. He returned to Atlant after completion of the 2012–13 season with Minsk.

Career statistics

Regular season and playoffs

International

References

External links

1981 births
Living people
Färjestad BK players
Finnish ice hockey defencemen
Ice hockey players at the 2010 Winter Olympics
Lukko players
Milwaukee Admirals players
Nashville Predators draft picks
Olympic bronze medalists for Finland
Olympic ice hockey players of Finland
People from Västerås
Tampa Bay Lightning players
Olympic medalists in ice hockey
Medalists at the 2010 Winter Olympics
Atlant Moscow Oblast players
Manchester Storm (1995–2002) players
EV Zug players
Frölunda HC players
Metallurg Magnitogorsk players
HC Dinamo Minsk players
Finnish expatriate ice hockey players in Belarus
Finnish expatriate ice hockey players in Russia
Finnish expatriate ice hockey players in Sweden
Finnish expatriate ice hockey players in Switzerland
Finnish expatriate ice hockey players in England
Finnish expatriate ice hockey players in the United States